South Bridge is a road bridge and street in Edinburgh, Scotland, between the High Street and Chambers Street/Infirmary Street. It extends to North Bridge at the north and Nicolson Street at the south, forming a level roadway over the steep valley scoured parallel to the High Street when the crag and tail landscape was formed. The Cowgate roadway along the bottom of the valley runs under the largest arch of the bridge.

The concept of the bridge was raised in 1784 by James Hunter Blair in his capacity as Lord Provost of Edinburgh, as a logical southward extension of the pre-existing North Bridge, which connected Edinburgh's Old Town to its New Town. The southward bridge, set on the same alignment, was to improve connection to the southward land, and spanned over the Cowgate. The works necessitated the loss of many buildings including the old Edinburgh Poultry Market.

The South Bridge Act 1785 was passed in the House of Commons of the United Kingdom on 21 April 1785 and in 1789 taxes were raised to fund the South Bridge to a plan prepared by Robert Adam. The foundation stone was laid on 1 August 1785 by George Gordon, Lord Haddo in his capacity as Grand Master Mason of Scotland. The incomplete bridge was opened to foot traffic on 19 November 1786 using planks of wood resting on the completed arches.

The bridge was completed in 1788. It is constructed of nineteen arches, but is almost entirely enclosed by buildings on both sides, exposing only the largest arch where the street crosses the Cowgate. Below deck level are many buildings and vaults, the latter are now something of a tourist attraction. Most of the buildings on the deck level have separate entrances (and sometimes entirely separate functions) at the level of the street passing below (the Cowgate) or parallel to the bridge (Niddry Street and Blair Street).

The only older element incorporated into the South Bridge streetscape was Adam Square, which occupied the extreme south-west section and was built around 1770. This section has been twice rebuilt since its demolition around 1870 to build Chambers Street.

In 2002 the "Cowgate Fire" destroyed a section of the original buildings in the south-west quadrant. This section has now been rebuilt as a hotel and supermarket.

The historic structure contains one interior of great significance: Goldsmiths Hall, a relatively intact room linked to the old trade guilds. This attic level space is wholly unseen from the exterior and is also now only accessed via a characterless corridor entered from Blair Street.

Initially, town plans such as John Ainslie's 1804 map showed the street name as "South Bridge Street", by the 1850s the name had been shortened to "South Bridge".

See also 
North Bridge, Edinburgh
George IV Bridge
2002 Cowgate Fire, which destroyed and damaged several South Bridge buildings.

References

External links
 Unbuilt Britain: Episode 3

Streets in Edinburgh
Category B listed buildings in Edinburgh
Edinburgh South Bridge
Bridges in Edinburgh
Bridges completed in 1788
1788 establishments in Scotland